Feedback is a Bangladeshi rock band, formed in October 1977 in Dhaka by keyboardist Foad Nasser Babu. Multiple lineup changes have taken place since 1976. They have released seven studio albums and have also appeared in some compilations.

History 
Their first appearance was in The Hotel Inter-continental (now the Sheraton), Dhaka, on 11 October 1976. Their first recorded song was "Aye Din Chiro Din Robey" in 1980. After Labu Rahman joined the band in 1987, they started concerts out of the hotels. They released their first album Feedback and then Sragam Acoustics. Feedback performed at Shilpakala Academy on 25 September 1989, at Dhaka University on 16 December 1990, at Nicco Park, Kolkata on 26 January 1992, at Jadavpur University on 12 July 1994.

In 1995, they were awarded best band from RTV for their song Jai Jai Din. Their most popular song is "Melai Jaire" , and some other popular songs are "Aye Din Chirodin Robey", "Ak Jhak Projapoti", "Jhau Bonay", "Udashi", "Moushumi 1 & 2", "Kemon Korey Hai", "Janala", "Majhi", "Bidrohi", "Geetikobita 1 & 2", and "Abar Mela".

Discography

Mixed albums
 Rongomela Vol.1
 Together
 Kiron
 Adda
 6 Band Mixed '99
 Aloron
 Millennium

Members

Present
Foad Nasser Babu (keyboards)
Labu Rahman (guitars & vocals)
Enam Elahi Tonty (drums & percussion)
Raihan Al Hasan (vocals & acoustic guitar)
Mohammed Danesh (bass)
Shahnur Rahman Lumin (vocals)
Sujan Arif (vocals)

Past
Maqsoodul Haque
Pearo Khan
Selim Haider
Murad Rahman
Ershad Moinuddin Popsy
Sekender Ahmed Khoka
Zakiur Rahman
Sanu Richter 
Kingsley Richter
Sandra Hoff
Omar Khaled Rumi
Musa Rahman
Dastagir Haque
A Z Khan Rommel
Shahriyar Sultan Piyash
Reshad Mahmood
Atiquzzaman Khan Bulbul

First lineup 
Foad Nasser Babu - keyboards
Ershad Moinuddin Popsy - drums
Murad Rahman - bass
Kingsley Richter - rhythm guitar & vocals
Sanu Richter - vocals
Salim Haider - lead guitar
Sandra Hoff - vocals
Hafizur Rahman - manager

References

External links 
 
 
 ফিডব্যাক: বাংলা ব্যান্ড জাগরণের এক সফল পথিকৃৎ
 ফিডব্যাক’র ৪২ বছরের পথচলায় গাইবে চার ব্যান্ড
 নতুন ফিডব্যাক, পুরোনো ফিডব্যাক

Musical groups established in 1976
1976 establishments in Bangladesh
Bangladeshi pop music groups
Bangladeshi blues musical groups